William W. Potter (August 1, 1869 – July 21, 1940) was a politician from the U.S. state of Michigan.

Potter was born to Lucien B. and Clarinda L. Potter in Maple Grove Township, Barry County, Michigan.  He was a resident of East Lansing and was married to Margaret D. Richardson.

Potter was an 1895 graduate of the University of Michigan Law School, and a member of the Michigan Senate from the 15th District, 1899–1900; Barry County Prosecuting Attorney, 1909–12; he became a candidate in the primary for Governor of Michigan, 1924.  He served as Michigan Attorney General from 1927 to 1928 and resigned when he was appointed justice of Michigan Supreme Court.  In 1935, he served as chief justice of the state supreme court.

William W. Potter was a member of Freemasons, Knights of Pythias, and Odd Fellows.  He died just before his 71st birthday, in office, following an automobile accident.  He is interred at Wilcox Cemetery, near his birthplace.

References
The Political Graveyard
Michigan Supreme Court Historical Society

1869 births
1940 deaths
American Freemasons
Burials in Michigan
Michigan Attorneys General
Michigan state senators
Chief Justices of the Michigan Supreme Court
People from Barry County, Michigan
Road incident deaths in Michigan
University of Michigan Law School alumni
Justices of the Michigan Supreme Court